Grand Junction Regional Airport  is  northeast of Grand Junction, in Mesa County, Colorado, United States. Owned by the Grand Junction Regional Airport Authority, it is the largest airport in western Colorado and third largest in the state, behind Denver International Airport and Colorado Springs Airport.

Federal Aviation Administration records show 212,588 passenger boardings (enplanements) in calendar year 2008, 228,850 in 2009, and 219,358 in 2010. The National Plan of Integrated Airport Systems for 2011–2015 designated it a non-hub primary commercial service airport (more than 10,000 enplanements per year).

History
The airport opened in 1930 as Grand Junction Municipal Airport. In 1942 it was renamed Walker Field for Walter Walker, a former publisher of The Daily Sentinel newspaper who helped obtain funds and business support for the airport. The airport and the airport authority were renamed on May 15, 2007.

Grand Junction Regional Airport is undergoing a $20 million renovation, of which $700,000 will pay for signs with the new name. The airport's terminal and fire building will continue to be named for Walker, and a new $19 million roadway under construction will be called Walter Walker Blvd. Tailwind Concessions provides food and beverages inside the terminal. A new runway will be built north of the existing one, with a target completion year of 2030. The present  runway will become a taxiway.

Terminal
Inside the terminal, the passenger waiting area has a gift shop and TV monitors. The terminal has three gates with jet bridges for regional jets; one other gate uses outdoor airstairs. Allegiant and American Eagle flights use gate 3 while Delta uses gate 4. United uses gate 6.

Facilities

In 2021 the airport saw 56,343 aircraft operations, averaging 154 per day: 70% general aviation, 14% air taxi, 12% airline, and 4% military. On December 29, 2022, 171 aircraft were based at this airport: 130 single-engine, 35 multi-engine, 4 jet, and 2 helicopter.

Airlines and destinations

Passenger

Cargo

Statistics

Top domestic destinations

Historical airline service

The first airline service at Grand Junction was by Western Airlines flying Douglas DC-4s on a Los Angeles - Las Vegas - Grand Junction - Denver route. Western soon sold this route to United Airlines in 1947 which continued the service using DC-4s but soon upgraded with Douglas DC-6s and, by the late 1960s, to Boeing 727-100 jets. GJT's runway was extended from 5400 ft to 7500 ft around 1965 and the airport then became the primary jet airport to serve the Aspen ski area. United started Saturday-only nonstops in the winter ski season to Los Angeles in the winter of 1969-70 and to Chicago and San Francisco in the 1970-71 ski season. GJT was the only airport in Colorado west of Denver that saw major airline jet service until Durango upgraded their runway in 1977. United's winter ski season flights ended after the 1981/82 season. Boeing 727-100 and Douglas DC-8 jet aircraft were used with some flights operating with the stretch version of the DC-8 called the DC-8-61. In mid-1980 United began a daily, year-round, nonstop flight to Los Angeles using Boeing 737-200s but dropped the flights to Denver and Las Vegas. One year later United discontinued the LAX flight which ended all service to GJT however United returned in mid-1982 with flights to Denver. Service ended once again in 1984. A new service to Denver entitled United Express began in 1987 and is noted below.

Monarch Airlines began flights in 1947 by serving Grand Junction as one of many stops on a route between Salt Lake City and Albuquerque. Flights to Denver were soon added and the carrier also used Douglas DC-3s. Successor Frontier Airlines (1950–1986) then served Grand Junction using DC-3s and upgrading with Convair 340s in the late 1950s and Convair 580s by the early 1960s. Frontier began the first jets at Grand Junction with Boeing 727-100s flying DEN-GJT-SLC and back starting in October, 1966. Some Frontier 727 flights flew direct to Kansas City and St. Louis. Boeing 737-200s later replaced Frontier's 727s by 1972 and their Convair 580s remained until 1982. Direct flights to Albuquerque ended in 1978 and to Salt Lake City ended in 1981. Frontier started ski season weekend-only 737s to Dallas beginning with the 1972/73 ski season and continuing through the 1979/80 season. Weekend ski season fights then operated to Los Angeles and Oakland for the 1981/82 and 1982/83 seasons. There was no ski service for the 1983/84 season, and the final year of ski flights was the 1984/85 season with nonstop flights to Dallas/Fort Worth, Houston, and Los Angeles.

Western Airlines returned to GJT operating Saturday only ski season flights to San Francisco beginning with the 1974/75 season. Western flew Boeing 737-200s. Service ended after the 1978/79 season but returned for the 1982/83 and 1983/84 seasons with Boeing 727-200 flights to Los Angeles, Salt Lake City, and San Francisco.

Several commuter airlines also served GJT in the 1970s. These include Western Air Stages with flights to Aspen, Steamboat Springs, and Vail, as well as Salt Lake City, Moab, and Vernal in Utah. In 1976 the carrier flew a GJT-Cortez-Farmington route. Sun Valley Key flew a GJT-Moab-Price-Salt Lake City route, and Bonanza Airlines and Air Colorado flew from GJT to Aspen late in the decade.

Continental Airlines began service to Denver in 1980 flying Boeing 727-100s, 727-200s, 737-200s, Douglas DC-9-10s, and DC-9-30s. Service began transitioning to commuter airlines operating as Continental Express on behalf of Continental in 1988 and Continental mainline jets ended in 1994. Continental Express service ended in 1995 when Continental ended their hub operation at Denver.

Transwestern Airlines, a commuter airline, began nonstop flights to Salt Lake City in 1979. Transwestern merged into Horizon Air in 1984 but ended service in 1985.

Mesa Airlines operated commuter flights to Farmington and Albuquerque in 1980 and again in the early 1990s. Flights to Denver began in 1990 as United Express and flights to Phoenix began in 1991, changing to America West Express in 1992 (further noted below).

Rocky Mountain Airways and Pioneer Airlines both provided service to Denver in 1984 and 1985. Pioneer operated as Continental Commuter on behalf of Continental Airlines.

Beginning in the mid-1980s, GJT began to see a series of commuter and regional airlines operate on behalf of major airlines. These airlines operated a variety of turboprop aircraft including the Convair 580, Fairchild Swearingen Metroliner, Beechcraft 1900, Embraer EMB 120 Brasilia, De Havilland Canada Dash 7 and Dash 8, Dornier 328, and ATR 42. By the late 1990s the carriers serving GJT began upgrading with regional jets including the British Aerospace 146, Bombardier CRJ100/200 and CRJ700, and the Embraer ERJ145 and E175.

SkyWest Airlines began service to Salt Lake City in 1984 as an independent commuter airline. In 1986 SkyWest teamed up with Western Airlines to operate as Western Express and the following year Western merged into Delta Air Lines changing SkyWest's designation to Delta Connection. This service on behalf of Delta still operates as of 2021.

America West Airlines began nonstop flights to Phoenix in 1985 using Boeing 737-200 jets. Some flights later began stopping in Durango and nonstop flights to Las Vegas were briefly added in 1990. All service ended in 1991 but returned in late 1992 as America West Express operated by Mesa Airlines. In 2007 America West merged into US Airways at which time the Phoenix flights began operating as US Airways Express. In 2015 US Airways merged into American Airlines and the Phoenix flights then began operating as American Eagle. This service continues as of 2021.

United Express service to Denver on behalf of United Airlines began in 1987 and continues as of 2021. Many regional and commuter carriers have operated as United Express including Aspen Airways, Mesa Airlines, Great Lakes Airlines, Air Wisconsin, ExpressJet, Trans States Airlines, GoJet Airlines, Republic Airways, and SkyWest Airlines. By 2010 all service to Denver had been upgraded with regional jets however between 2013 and 2017, some United Express flights were operated with Dash 8 Q400 turboprops. Summer seasonal nonstop flights to Chicago's O'Hare International Airport on Saturdays only began in 2020.

Air21 flew nonstop to Colorado Springs and Las Vegas and direct to Los Angeles using Fokker F28 Fellowship jets for a brief time in 1996 and 1997.

Maverick Airways, a very short-lived carrier operating De Havilland Canada Dash 7 aircraft, provided service to Denver for a brief time in 1997.

Great Lakes Airlines started serving GJT with flights to Denver in 1998 as United Express but reverted to its own branding in 2002. The Denver flights continued until 2008.

Allegiant Air began flights on two days per week to Las Vegas in 2006 using McDonnell Douglas MD-80 jets. Flights to Los Angeles were added in 2009 also operating twice per week and now operate on a seasonal basis. Flights to the Phoenix–Mesa Gateway Airport began in 2019 and to Santa Ana, California in 2021. The carrier switched from MD-80s to Airbus A319 aircraft in the late 2010s.

American Eagle began nonstop flights to Dallas/Fort Worth in 2008. Flights to Phoenix were added in 2015 with the merger of US Airways (noted above). Both services continue as of 2021. Summer seasonal nonstop flights to Los Angeles on Saturdays only are planned to begin in 2021. Carriers operating as American eagle include Envoy Air, Mesa Airlines, and SkyWest Airlines.

The new Frontier Airlines began flights to Denver in 2008 by way of a subsidiary carrier called Lynx Aviation. Lynx used Dash 8 Q400 turboprop aircraft and continued service until 2010.

Continental Express began regional jet flights to the George Bush Intercontinental Airport in Houston in 2011. Continental merged into United Airlines in 2012 and the Houston flights then operated as United Express. Service ended in 2016.

Denver Air Connection, operated by Key Lime Air, began service in the 2012 with flights to the Centennial Airport in south Denver and to the Rocky Mountain Metropolitan Airport on the north side of Denver. The carrier has suspended service during the COVID-19 pandemic but is planned to resume.

After Continental Airlines discontinued their last mainline jet in 1994, GJT was only served with turboprop aircraft for most of the remaining 1990s decade. All carriers upgraded with regional jets in the 2000s and the only mainline jets at Grand Junction are now operated by Allegiant Air which began in 2006. As of 2021 Allegiant flies Airbus A319/A320s.

References

External links

 
 Grand Junction Regional Airport (GJT) at Colorado Department of Transportation airport directory
 
 
 

Airports in Colorado
Grand Junction, Colorado
Transportation buildings and structures in Mesa County, Colorado